is a former Japanese football and futsal player.

Football career
Ito was born in Chofu on April 20, 1978. After graduating from Komazawa University, he joined the J1 League club FC Tokyo in 2001. However he did not play at all, he retired at the end of the 2001 season.

Futsal career
In 2003, Ito became a futsal player.  He played for Fuchu Athletic FC (2003–05, 2010–11) and Deução Kobe (2007-2010). He twice won third place in the F.League, in 2007–08 and in 2008–09, while with Deução Kobe. He retired in 2011.

Coaching career
After retirement, Ito became futsal manager for Fuchu Athletic FC, Vasagey Oita. In March 2016, he became manager for the Japan women's national futsal team. He managed Japan at the 2017 Asian Indoor and Martial Arts Games and Japan won the silver medal. He resigned after the games.

Club statistics

References

External links
profile by Japan Football Association

1978 births
Living people
Komazawa University alumni
Association football people from Tokyo
Japanese footballers
J1 League players
FC Tokyo players
Association football midfielders
Japanese futsal coaches